Hyperstrotia flaviguttata, the yellow-spotted graylet, is a moth in the family Erebidae. The species was first described by Augustus Radcliffe Grote in 1882.

The MONA or Hodges number for Hyperstrotia flaviguttata is 9039.

References

Further reading

External links

 

Boletobiinae
Articles created by Qbugbot
Moths described in 1882